The International Stability Operations Association (ISOA), formerly known as the International Peace Operations Association (IPOA), is a trade association founded in April 2001. IPOA was created to support the private military and disaster relief industries, and is based in Washington, D.C., United States.

Member companies 
 ArmorGroup
 Blackwater (company)
 Erinys International
 Evergreen International Aviation
 Military Professional Resources Inc.
 Unity Resources Group

External links
 ISOA website
 Description of IPOA on Conflict Resolution Information Source
 Journal of International Peace Operations

Organizations established in 2001
Trade associations based in the United States
Non-profit organizations based in Washington, D.C.
501(c)(6) nonprofit organizations